Ellie Mills (also Hunter) is a fictional character from the British soap opera Hollyoaks, played by Sarah Baxendale. The character made her first on-screen appearance on 22 February 2002 and made her final appearance during the episode broadcast on 25 March 2005.

Casting
Baxendale made her first on-screen appearance as Ellie during the episode broadcast on 22 February 2002. She told Steve Hendry from the Sunday Mail that "coming into it is exciting. I'm working with people I've been watching for a long time, but they have made me welcome."

Development
On the show's official website, Ellie is described as a "gregarious, determined and independent" female. Prior to Ellie's introduction into the series, she played a significant part of the Hunter families stories. Ellie had been missing in Ibiza for some time and unexpectedly arrives in Chester. Ellie's disappearance caused the Hunter family a great deal of emotional distress. Ellie fails to understand their predicament. Baxendale told the Sunday Mail's Hendry that her character "is a bit of a bitch". Not having to answer to anyone for two years has made her this way. She had been able to do whatever she wanted and make her own decisions. She added that Elle does not think she needs to watch her behaviour to please others or think about anyone other than herself. Baxendale assessed that Ellie "doesn't try to be a bitch, but she does end up being that way. She's not malicious, but she is quite harsh to people. Ellie is very confident, selfish without trying to be and holds her emotions back from her family because she doesn't know how to deal with them." Baxendale enjoyed playing Ellie because she was completely different to her. She branded Ellie a "really meaty character rather than a weak victim-type – she is all about going for it."

Ellie's family have different reactions to her arrival in Hollyoaks. Ellie's younger sister Lisa Hunter (Gemma Atkinson) is delighted by her return. Atkinson told Francesca Babb from All About Soap that "Lisa couldn't be more pleased to see her." She added that everyone is "really surprised" and she finds it difficult to believe she is back because her family did not expect to see her again. Ellie's brother Dan Hunter (Andrew McNair) is angry at her. Dan believes their family are being too kind towards Ellie. Atkinson added that "she put the family through hell and now they are all treading on eggshells around her. Dan thinks they at least deserve an explanation as to the reasons why she disappeared." Lisa cannot understand Dan's frustrations and warns that his behaviour could cause Ellie to run away again. Ellie soon makes it clear that she is staying and bonds with Lisa. Atkinson described Ellie as "very confident" and Lisa "loves" her attitude. She added that Ellie is also a "very bolshy and bitchy" which her family choose ignore to please her. Ellie soon starts behaving in a "quite arrogant" and "flippant" way and Atkinson concluded that "the Hunters are too scared to say anything to her".

Writers created a relationship between Ellie and Ben Davies (Marcus Patric). The two characters were used to break a world record of the longest kiss featured in film, set by the Guinness Book of Records. The two characters kissed for a total of 3 minutes and 15 seconds. It broke the record previously set in 1941, from the comedy film You're in the Army Now. To achieve the record the characters take part in an event on National Kissing Day, hosted at their local nightclub The Loft. Baxendale described filming the scenes during an interview with Emma Johnson from the Liverpool Echo. She recalled "I think we did it in about five takes but not every kiss went on for the full three minutes! I had kissed Marcus before, because our characters have been a couple for a few weeks now, but I cleaned my teeth about 50 million times." Hollyoaks held the title until 2013.

Writers soon showcased Ellie's bitchy persona when she makes more drama for her ex-boyfriend Toby Mills (Henry Luxemburg). When he begins a relationship with Mandy Richardson (Sarah Jayne Dunn), she decides to interfere. Toby finds Mandy overbearing and he finds it difficult to have a serious relationship after the drama Ellie caused him. Luxemburg told All About Soap's Babb that Toby has a "light-hearted" relationship with Mandy after "all the troubles" Ellie caused for him. He is "wary" of getting into a long-term relationship because Ellie made it "so complicated". Mandy fails to notice Toby's reluctance and Ellie takes delight in mocking the couple. Luxemburg explained that "Ellie has been teasing him for being under the thumb which isn't helping things. She has a way of getting at Toby, she knows exactly what to say to wind him up and when she makes comments about Mandy, it really annoys him."

Toby tries to show Ellie that he and Mandy are casual and invites her and Ben around for dinner. He plans a takeaway but Mandy changes their plans and gets out her best silverware. Toby is embarrassed and thinks it will provide Ellie with more reason to mock him. Toby misinterprets a conversation between himself and Mandy and incorrectly believes that she wants to end their relationship. He attends a party the following day, only to discover Mandy still believes they are together. Ellie notices his predicament and decides to publicly humiliate the pair. Ellie has "no qualms" about announcing that Toby does not want to be with Mandy in front of her friends. Luxemburg concluded that "Toby is furious at Ellie for shooting her mouth off. And he's absolutely gutted she had to find out this way."

Writers included Ellie at the centre of one of their most prolific storylines when she discovers that she is married to a serial killer. His crimes include the attempted murder of Steph Dean (Carley Stenson) and murdering his mother Linda Mills. Toby begins to struggle with guilt and Ellie presumes he is grieving over his mother's death. He agrees to go to counselling but has to conceal the truth. Toby asks Ellie to move away with him, believing it will resolve his guilt. Ellie refuses to leave and Toby leaves alone. He soon returns and confesses that he is a serial killer. Luxemburg told Dorothy Koomson from All About Soap that his character can no longer lie to Ellie. He tells Ellie about Steph and Linda, but she refuses to believe him. Luxemburg explained that "at first Ellie doesn't believe a word of what Toby says, but he keeps repeating it until she does." He added that Ellie makes excuses for Toby and "justifies" his behaviour claiming that his mother's death was accidental and Steph must have provoked him. Luxemburg believed that Toby was "selfish" for telling Ellie the truth. He knows that to have a future with Ellie, they need honesty. Toby thinks that he and Ellie are "stronger than ever" but the burden of his crimes "is really doing Ellie's head in". He concluded that Toby is "deluded if he thinks he can get away with what he's done, especially now he's confessed."

Ellie decides to stay with Toby but Dan notices something is wrong with the couple and blames Ellie. McNair told Alison James from Soaplife that Dan has never forgiven Ellie for running away to Ibiza. He believes that she is the cause of her and Toby's problems and even accuses her of having an affair with Scott Anderson (Daniel Hyde). Dan discovers that Ellie has been drugging Toby, unaware she is trying to keep herself safe. McNair explained "Dan knows there's something not right going on and he blames Ellie for it. He knows what a bitch she can be and doesn't trust her." When Toby murders another woman, he is left with bruises from the fatal struggle. Dan notices the bruises and accuses Ellie of domestic violence towards Toby. He tells Dan that he and Ellie are happy and trying to start a family together. He puts Ellie's life in danger by revealing that she is taking contraception pills to prevent any pregnancy from occurring. McNair defended his character, stating "thinking that Ellie's being selfish as always, Dan tells Toby the truth."

Ellie escapes and flees to Liverpool. Toby locks Lisa in his flat and tracks Ellie down. When Dan finds Lisa, they too travel to Liverpool to save Ellie. Producers planned the location filming to coincide with their special late night episode of Hollyoaks. The episode features a dramatic stunt and the demise of Toby. McNair told James that "it's hardly a happy ending for all three" and that his character becomes embroiled in Ellie and Toby's storyline. He added that Dan's "fate is tied up with her. Those Liverpool scenes were exhausting to do but really exciting at the same time."

Storylines
The eldest Hunter child was a runaway living in Ibiza for two years without contacting her family before returning, not out of love, but rather because she had run out of money. She was a man-eater and was responsible for the spread of an STD that Jamie Nash (Stefan Booth) got the blame for. She often caused trouble for her family and often went against her mother's wishes. When she arrived on town, she discovered that her brother Lee Hunter (Alex Carter) was always getting in trouble with the police and school, and failed exams, and Lisa self-harmed after she was bullied by Steph, while Dan was depressed because she ran away from home.

She married Toby, who her family approved of, but this was a huge mistake, as he was in fact a serial killer. Ellie ran off again, and Toby and Dan went off to look for her, but the night ended in disaster when Toby died, Ellie was left unconscious after falling from a roof and Dan was in the frame for his murder. The Hunter clan desperately awaited for Ellie to wake up to clear Dan's name, but on waking, she had lost her memory and accused Dan of murdering her husband.

Her family turned against her, including her father, and Ellie also incurred the wrath of Johnno Dean (Colin Wells) and his wife Frankie Osborne (Helen Pearson), whose daughters Steph and Debbie Dean (Jodi Albert) had their lives ruined by Toby, Steph nearly lost her life after being attacked by Toby and was left with epilepsy as a result of the attack; and Debbie, who had been in a relationship with Dan, having lost her boyfriend due to his wrongful imprisonment. Ellie's actions led to an explosive confrontation with Johnno, and her father Les Hunter (John Graham Davies) had to step in and prevent his business partner from physically attacking Ellie. The atmosphere in the Hunter household was too much and her mother Sally Hunter (Katherine Dow-Blyton) disowned her daughter. Ellie's memory eventually returned and Dan was cleared, but her mother was unable to forgive her.

Dan refused to forgive her, and after he died, Sally made it clear that she was no longer a part of the family and said she wished that Ellie had died instead of Dan. Ellie continued to live with the family, but tensions flared up yet again when she needed tuition money and asked Sally if she could get back some of the money she'd given to help Dan start the Pit Stop. An angry Sally gave her a cheque for all the money, further alienating Ellie from her mother and siblings. Les had moved away due to Dan's death and the family strife and Sally decided to look for him. When Lee and Lisa decided to go and find their parents, Ellie wanted to go along, but they refused, telling her once and for all that she didn't fit in. While they were all gone, Ellie had a drink with Russ Owen (Stuart Manning) and Dannii Carbone (Christina Baily) and realised she had nothing left in Chester. She packed her bags and watched a few old family videos from when she and Dan were kids. Full of remorse, she left a goodbye letter and the ripped-up cheque from Sally. After taking one last look around the family home, she left.

When the Hunters returned to find her missing, they initially rowed over who was responsible for her leaving and whether she just wanted to hurt them yet again. Bombhead (Lee Otway) convinced them she was just trying to do what she thought they wanted and that they should be happy. They sent Ellie an e-mail, telling her they loved her and do care for her and to contact them any time she wanted. Sally later told her husband and her children that Ellie is now living in France, finishing her schooling and having found work.

References

External links
 Character profile at Hollyoaks.com

Hollyoaks characters
Television characters introduced in 2002
Female characters in television